Alambagh (Hindi: आलमबाग़) is a settlement located in Lucknow near Kanpur road in India. It is one of the most important residential and commercial areas of Lucknow and also one of the densely populated areas of the city. Alambagh falls in the Lucknow Cantonment constituency.

History

Earlier Alambagh contained a palace, a mosque and other buildings, as well as a beautiful garden. Alambagh was converted into a fort in November 1857 during the Indian mutiny of 1857. The fort, under the command of General Outram was attacked repeatedly, but unsuccessfully until March 1858 when Sir Colin Campbell returned to attack Lucknow. After the British defeated the mutineers it served as the military command center for Lucknow and the nearby towns.

Present
Alambagh is towards the south end of Lucknow and serves as a common market place for surrounding villages. Farmers from nearby villages visit Alambagh every morning to whole sell vegetables and crops to distributors and local retailers, who in turn distribute the vegetables and crops to retailers throughout Lucknow city.

Transport
Alambagh has the Alambagh bus depot. It is well connected to other parts of the city by Kanpur road in south, Sitapur road in west and roads built by the state government in other two directions. It also now has a metro station connecting to airport as well as railway station known as Charbagh. Autorickshaws and tempos are also a popular means of transport in Alambagh.

Education
Alambagh has some of the most prestigious schools of Lucknow.
 Janata Boys Inter College 
New Public Collegiate Inter College 
Spring Dale School 
 City Montessori School
 St. Mary's Convent
 Janata Girl's Inter College
 St. Ann's Day Public School
 Stella Mary's School
 Kendriya Vidyalaya
 S K D Academy
 Lucknow Public School
 Guru Nanak Girls Inter College
 Krishna Devi Girls Inter College
 New Public Inter College
 Avadh Collegiate Day Boarding Inter College
 Lok Bharti Inter College

See also
Indian Mutiny
Lucknow
Robert Grant VC
Siege of Lucknow
Sir James Outram
U P CLDF

References and sources

External links

Neighbourhoods in Lucknow